The 1982 Junior League World Series (then known as the 13 year old Little League World Series) took place from August 17–21 in Taylor, Michigan, United States. Tampa, Florida defeated Libertyville, Illinois in the championship game.

Teams

Results

Notable players
Gary Sheffield (Tampa, Florida) - former MLB outfielder
Derek Bell (Tampa, Florida) - former MLB outfielder
Delino DeShields (Seaford, Delaware) - former MLB infielder

References

Junior League World Series
Junior League World Series
Junior